Indiana County is a county in the Commonwealth of Pennsylvania. It is located in the west central part of Pennsylvania. As of the 2020 census, the population was 83,246. Its county seat is Indiana. Indiana County comprises the Indiana, PA Micropolitan Statistical Area, which is also included in the Pittsburgh-New Castle-Weirton, PA-WV-OH Combined Statistical Area.

Prior to the Revolutionary War, some settlers proposed this as part of a larger, separate colony to be known as Vandalia, but opposing interests and the war intervened. Afterward, claims to the territory by both the states of Virginia and Pennsylvania had to be reconciled. After this land was assigned to Pennsylvania by the federal government according to the placement of the Mason–Dixon line, Indiana County was created on March 30, 1803, from parts of Westmoreland and Clearfield counties and was formally organized in 1806.

History
Indiana County (Indiana meaning "land of the Indians") derives its name from the so-called "Indiana Grant of 1768" that the Iroquois Six Nations were forced to make to "suffering traders" under the Fort Stanwix Treaty of 1768. The Iroquois had controlled much of the Ohio River valley as their hunting grounds since the 17th century, and Anglo-American colonists were moving into the area and wanted to develop it. Traders arranged to force the Iroquois to grant land under the treaty in relations to losses due to Pontiac's Rebellion.

Some of the grantees joined forces with the Ohio Company, forming a larger development company based on enlarging their grant of land. They proposed that the entire large area would become a new British colony, possibly to be called Pittsylvania or Vandalia. It was to be bordered on the north and west by the Ohio River, and made up of what are now parts of eastern Kentucky, northern West Virginia (then part of the Virginia Colony), and western Pennsylvania. Anglo-European colonists from Virginia and Pennsylvania had already started to move into the area, which was identified by these various names as Indiana and the other above names on some maps of the late 1700s.

Opposition from other interest groups and the American Revolutionary War intervened before Britain approved such a colony. Afterward, some United States speculators proposed setting up a state in this area to be called Vandalia, or Westsylvania, as appears on some maps of the period.

But both the states of Virginia and Pennsylvania claimed the land based on their colonial charters. In establishing the Mason–Dixon line, the federal government assigned the Indiana Grant to Pennsylvania. As population increased after the war, this county was made up in 1803 of territory from Westmoreland and Clearfield counties; it was formally organized in 1806.

Kentucky and West Virginia continued to be associated with Virginia for some time, being separately admitted as states in the early 19th century and during the American Civil War, respectively. The area in Pennsylvania was unrelated to and was physically separated from the later named Indiana Territory established north of the Ohio River in 1800 by the new United States; that territory was eventually admitted to the Union as the State of Indiana.

Indiana County was known as a "hotbed of abolition", and was home to at least two African Methodist Episcopal Zion churches as well as other anti-slavery Protestants such as Wesleyan Methodists and Baptists. It was also   in Indiana, local abolitionist leader James Moorhead published several anti-slavery newspapers. The first of these was The Clarion of Freedom, founded in 1843. Moorhead eventually sold the Clarion and founded a new anti-slavery paper, the Indiana Independent, which he published until his death in 1857. The Independent was published by his son J. W. Moorhead after his death. Blairsville was home to another abolitionist newspaper, The Appalachian, which was pro-Free Soil from 1848.

Indiana County was an active hub of the Underground Railroad. At least 90 county residents are known to have been conductors or agents, guiding fugitive slaves between hiding places on their way to freedom in Canada.

In the 21st century, Indiana County comprises the Indiana, PA Micropolitan Statistical Area. This is included in the Pittsburgh-New Castle-Weirton, PA-WV-OH Combined Statistical Area. It is in the defined region of the Pittsburgh media market. Indiana County is served by three different area codes: 724, 814, and 582.

The county proclaims itself the "Christmas Tree Capital of the World", shipping over one million trees annually. Agriculture is a major part of its economy.

Geography
Located in the county is the Buttermilk Falls Natural Area. The county has a humid continental climate which is warm-summer, (Dfb) except along the Conemaugh, from below Strangford and the Kiskiminetas River, where it is hot-summer (Dfa). Average monthly temperatures in the borough of Indiana range from 27.2 °F in January to 70.9 °F in July.

Adjacent counties
 Jefferson County (north)
 Clearfield County (northeast)
 Cambria County (southeast)
 Westmoreland County (south)
 Armstrong County (west)

Major highways

Demographics
As of the census of 2000, there were 89,605 people, 34,123 households, and 22,521 families residing in the county.  The population density was 108 people per square mile (42/km2).  There were 37,250 housing units at an average density of 45 per square mile (17/km2).  The racial makeup of the county was 96.87% White, 1.57% Black or African American, 0.08% Native American, 0.74% Asian, 0.01% Pacific Islander, 0.16% from other races, and 0.58% from two or more races.  0.51% of the population were Hispanic or Latino of any race. 25.9% were of German, 11.6% Italian, 10.7% Irish, 8.6% American, 7.1% English and 6.8% Polish ancestry.

There were 34,123 households, out of which 27.90% had children under the age of 18 living with them, 54.30% were married couples living together, 8.20% had a female householder with no husband present, and 34.00% were non-families. 26.50% of all households were made up of individuals, and 11.80% had someone living alone who was 65 years of age or older.  The average household size was 2.47 and the average family size was 2.99.

In the county, the population was spread out, with 21.10% under the age of 18, 16.60% from 18 to 24, 24.80% from 25 to 44, 22.70% from 45 to 64, and 14.90% who were 65 years of age or older.  The median age was 36 years. For every 100 females, there were 94.00 males.  For every 100 females age 18 and over, there were 90.60 males.

2020 Census

Micropolitan Statistical Area

The United States Office of Management and Budget has designated Indiana County as the Indiana, PA Micropolitan Statistical Area (µSA).  As of the 2010 U.S. Census the micropolitan area ranked 4th most populous in the State of Pennsylvania and the 50th most populous in the United States with a population of 88,880.  Indiana County is also a part of the Pittsburgh-New Castle-Weirton, PA-OH-WV Combined Statistical Area (CSA), which combines the population of Indiana, as well as the Allegheny, Armstrong, Beaver, Butler, Fayette, Lawrence, Washington and Westmoreland county areas in Pennsylvania.  In West Virginia the counties included are Brooke and Hancock.  And in Ohio, Jefferson County.  The Combined Statistical Area ranked 4th in the State of Pennsylvania and 20th most populous in the United States with a population of 2,660,727.

Government and politics
Indiana County has been strongly Republican in presidential elections for most of its history, only backing Democratic party candidates four times in presidential elections from 1880 to the present day.

|}

As of the 2016 primary election held April 26, 2016, there were 48,710 registered voters across Indiana County's 69 precincts: 20,089 Democrats (41.24%); 22,134 Republicans (45.44%); and 6,487 Independents (13.32%). This represents a slight demographic shift since November 2008, when a total of 58,077 registered voters were 45.89% (26,653) Democrat, 41.60% (24,159) Republican, and 12.51% (7,265) Independent.

County commissioners
Michael Keith, Chairman, Republican
Robin Gorman, Republican
Sherene Hess, Democrat

Other county offices
Coroner, Jerry L Overman Jr, Republican
District Attorney, Robert Manzi, Republican
Prothonotary, Randy Degenkolb, Republican
Recorder of Deeds and Register of Wills, Maria Jack, Republican
Sheriff, Robert Fyock, Republican
Treasurer, Kimberly McCullough, Republican
Board of Auditors, Donna Cupp, Republican; Bonni S. Dunlap, Ph.D., Republican; James P. Smith Jr., Democrat

State representatives
 Jason Silvis, Republican, 55th district
 Abby Major, Republican, 60th district
 James Struzzi, Republican, 62nd district
 Brian Smith, Republican, 66th district

State senator
 Joe Pittman, Republican, 41st district

United States representative
 Glenn Thompson, Republican, 15th district
 Guy Reschenthaler, Republican, 14th district

United States senators
 Bob Casey Jr., Democrat
 John Fetterman, Democrat

Education

Public school districts
 Armstrong School District (part)
 Apollo-Ridge School District (part)
 Blairsville-Saltsburg School District (part)
 Harmony Area School District (part)
 Homer-Center School District
 Indiana Area School District
 Marion Center Area School District
 Penns Manor Area School District
 Punxsutawney Area School District (part)
 Purchase Line School District (part)
 United School District

Post-secondary education
 Indiana University of Pennsylvania – Indiana
 Westmoreland County Community College – Indiana

Environment
In 2003, the county was recommended for non-attainment under EPA ozone standards based upon mobile source contribution to smog-forming emissions.

The county is the site of the Homer City Generating Station, a coal-burning power plant. In 2002 the plant was ranked as second in emissions in the Toxics Release Inventory (TRI) in Pennsylvania. In 2003, the plant ranked high in the emissions of both sulfur dioxide and carbon dioxide, ranking 4th and 28th, respectively, in the nation. Such toxic emissions are injurious to people and other living things.

Communities

Under Pennsylvania law, there are four types of incorporated municipalities: cities, boroughs, townships, and, in at most two cases, towns. The following boroughs and townships are located in Indiana County:

Boroughs

 Armagh
 Blairsville
 Cherry Tree
 Clymer
 Creekside
 Ernest
 Glen Campbell
 Homer City
 Indiana (county seat)
 Marion Center
 Plumville
 Saltsburg
 Shelocta
 Smicksburg

Townships

 Armstrong
 Banks
 Black Lick
 Brush Valley
 Buffington
 Burrell
 Canoe
 Center
 Cherryhill
 Conemaugh
 East Mahoning
 East Wheatfield
 Grant
 Green
 Montgomery
 North Mahoning
 Pine
 Rayne
 South Mahoning
 Washington
 West Mahoning
 West Wheatfield
 White
 Young

Census-designated places
Census-designated places are geographical areas designated by the U.S. Census Bureau for the purposes of compiling demographic data. They are not actual jurisdictions under Pennsylvania law. Other unincorporated communities, such as villages, may be listed here as well.

 Black Lick
 Chevy Chase Heights
 Commodore
 Coral
 Dicksonville
 Graceton
 Heilwood
 Jacksonville
 Lucerne Mines
 Robinson
 Rossiter

Unincorporated communities

 Alverda
 Arcadia
 Clarksburg
 Covode
 Dilltown
 Dixonville
 Gipsy
 Home
 Iselin
 Jewtown
 Locust
 Loop
 Mentcle
 Nolo
 Rexis
 Rochester Mills
 Starford
 Strongstown
 Wehrum
 West Lebanon

Population ranking
The population ranking of the following table is based on the 2010 census of Indiana County.

* county seat

Notable people
 Edward Abbey, environmentalist and author
 Henry Homer "Doc" Gessler, professional baseball player and manager; born and died in  Indiana Borough.
 James H. Brady, Governor of Idaho 1909–11, U.S. Senator 1913–18, born in Indiana County
 John Buccigross, ESPN anchor, former co-host of NHL 2Night
 Samuel Kier, "Grandfather of the American Oil Industry"
 Mary D. Lowman, one of first women mayors in Kansas; county native
 Ben McAdoo, former head coach, New York Giants
 Jim Nance, football player, running back for Syracuse University and professionally with New England/Boston Patriots
 James Stewart, iconic actor, born in Indiana Borough

See also
 Indiana County Transit Authority
 National Register of Historic Places listings in Indiana County, Pennsylvania

References

External links

 
 The Indiana County Tourist Bureau
  The Historical & Genealogical Society of Indiana County

 
Pittsburgh metropolitan area
1806 establishments in Pennsylvania
Populated places established in 1806
Counties of Appalachia